Dorneyville is a census-designated place in Lehigh County, Pennsylvania. As of the 2020 census the population was 4,850. Dorneyville is located just west of Allentown in South Whitehall Township and Salisbury Township. 

It is located off Interstate 78 and is home to the northern terminus of U.S. Route 222. It is split between the Allentown ZIP codes of 18103 and 18104. It is part of the Lehigh Valley metropolitan area, which had a population of 861,899 and was the 68th most populous metropolitan area in the U.S. as of the 2020 census.

Dorneyville is home to the Dorney Park & Wildwater Kingdom amusement park. The historic King George Inn, founded in 1756, also is located in Dorneyville.

Geography
Dorneyville is located in south-central Lehigh County in the southern corner of South Whitehall Township and the west end of Salisbury Township. It is bordered to the northeast and east by the Allentown city limits, and to the northwest by the unincorporated community of Cetronia. Interstate 78 forms the southern boundary of Dorneyville, with access from Exit 54 (US-222/Hamilton Boulevard) and Exit 55 (South Cedar Crest Boulevard). I-78 leads west  to Harrisburg, the state capital, and east  to the Holland Tunnel and Lower Manhattan. US-222 leads southwest  to Reading. South Cedar Crest Boulevard leads south as Pennsylvania Route 29,  to Emmaus.

Cedar Creek, a northeast-flowing tributary of Little Lehigh Creek, runs through the northwest side of the CDP, where Dorney Park is located. Via the Little Lehigh, Dorneyville is part of the Lehigh River and consequently the Delaware River watersheds.

Demographics 

As of the census of 2010, there were 4,406 people and 1,705 total housing units. The 2013-2017 American Community Survey 5-Year Estimates determined that the current population of Dorneyville is somewhere around 4,262. About 46.9% is male and 53.1% is female. The median age is 48.2. The racial makeup is about 85.6% White, 9.5% African American, 3.0% Asian, 0.6% Hispanic or Latino 0.5% of some other race, and 1.3% of two or more races. 96.2% of people have graduated high school. The median household income is $88,968. Only 2.2% of civilians lie below the poverty line.

References

Census-designated places in Lehigh County, Pennsylvania
Census-designated places in Pennsylvania